Opera Roanoke is professional opera company in Southwest Virginia presenting fully staged productions and a variety of smaller-scale presentations each year. The company is resident in Shaftman Performance Hall at Jefferson Center, Opera Roanoke serves a wide geographic area, including the cities of Roanoke, Salem, Lynchburg, Lexington, and Blacksburg, as well as Martinsville.

The company was founded in 1976 as the Southwest Virginia Opera Society (SVOS). Its inaugural production, Menotti's The Consul, was mounted in May 1978. Performances of The Marriage of Figaro and Die Fledermaus constituted the 1978-1979 season.

In 2006, the company celebrated its 30th Season with main stage productions of La Boheme and Macbeth. The 2010/2011 season consisted of one staged production, Madame Butterfly and several concerts and recitals. Their offices are located in the Center in the Square in downtown Roanoke.

References

External links
Official website

Roanoke
Roanoke, Virginia
Tourist attractions in Roanoke, Virginia
Musical groups established in 1976
Performing arts in Virginia